The Bengbu South railway station is a high-speed railway station in Bengbu, Anhui, People's Republic of China, which is served by the Jinghu High-Speed Railway.

The station is a 20,000 sq. m facility, designed by architects from the University of Southern California. Although presently the new station is located in a rather rural area outside of the city's urban core, development plans provide for a 9.27-km2 "high-speed railway station district"  around the  station.

References

Railway stations in Anhui
Railway stations in China opened in 2011
Bengbu